Udumbunthala is a small village located in Trikarpur Panchayath, in the Kasaragod district of Kerala State in India.

Places of worship
Masjid and temple

History
About 1000 years ago, this area was under sea. When Calamities occurred, many places and rivers appeared like Udumbunthala Kavayi river, Madakkal Island, Kadappuram Padincharan river, Kadappuram etc. Gradually some Fudel Rulers entered with so many workers in this area and landscaped for their dwellings and cultivation.  After that, Families from Nalupurappattu invaded the places where Udumbunthala, Kaikottukadavu, Valvakkad and Madakkal.  Brothers like Nalupurappattu Ibrahim Haji and Mohammed Kunchi Haji were ruled till their death.they devoted some of their lands to the masjid committees as Waqf.

Transportation
Local roads have access to NH.66 which connects to Mangalore in the north and Calicut in the south. The nearest railway station is Payyanur railway station at Payyanur on the Mangalore—Palakkad line.  There are airports at Mangalore, Kannur International Airpor and Kozhikode Airport, nearest one is Kannur Int. Airport

References

Cheruvathur area